Ando-Roid, stylized as , is a Japanese television drama series which premiered on TBS on 13 October 2013. Takuya Kimura is the lead actor, and he plays dual role in this drama. The 1st episode is 69 minutes, 2nd episode is 64 minutes long.

Plot 
Reiji Matsushima is a genius physicist. He realizes that he and his fiancé Asahi Ando will be killed as the theory which he advanced.
One day, in the year 2013, Reiji dies in an airplane explosion & crash. He was a handsome and world-famous professor who studied wormhole theories. It is a mystery whether his research on wormhole theory caused his death or not.
His fiancé Asahi is a capable career woman working at a large IT company. She is beautiful and smart, but she met Reiji and fell in love with him. Her days with Reiji were happy, but one day he dies and somebody tries to killer. Asahi doesn't know why someone wants to end her life.
Lloyd, who looks exactly like her dead fiancé Reiji, suddenly appears in front of her. Lloyd came from the year 2113. His mission is to protect Asahi from any risky situations. Without Asahi's knowledge, Lloyd fights to protect her. Lloyd doesn't know what "love" is and doesn't understand human anger or sadness.
At first, Asahi doesn't like Lloyd, but slowly her feelings change. Lloyd also begins to develop feelings for her.

Cast 
 Takuya Kimura as Andō Lloyd/Reiji Matsushima (dual role)
 Kou Shibasaki as Asahi Andō, Reiji's fiancée
 Yuko Oshima as Nanase Matsushima, Reiji's sister
 Tsubasa Honda as Sapuri, a fixer android
 Kenta Kiritani as Shinzō Hoshi, a computer expert work for Asahi
 Sayaka Yamaguchi as Sakiko Komatsu, a woman work with Hoshi
 Jessie as Tom Edogawa, Reiji's lab assistant
 Mitsuki Yamamoto as Kaoru Kuriyama, Reiji's lab assistant
 Dai Ikeda as Tomoharu Kurata, Reiji's lab assistant
 Yōji Hino as Yoshiyuki Tomiya, a detective
 Kenichi Endō as Isaku Ashimo, a detective
 Mirei Kiritani as a mysterious beautiful girl
 Yūta Hiraoka as Hajime Kadoshiro, a mysterious bureaucrat executive
 Yūko Natori as Keiko Andō, Asahi's mother

Episodes

References

External links 

 Official website
 
 allcinema 

Japanese drama television series
2013 in Japanese television
2013 Japanese television series debuts
2013 Japanese television series endings
Nichiyō Gekijō
Television shows written by Yumie Nishiogi